Richard Moreta Castillo, also known as Richard Moreta, is an American architect, urban planner, industrial designer, artist, and a diplomat.

Biography
Castillo was born in New York City, United States and grew up in the Dominican Republic. At the age of five, Castillo won a painting competition, and was discovered by the Dominican Artist Nidia Serra, who was part of the jury of the event. She noticed Richard's early dominion of perspective theory and advanced notion of color composition and took him as her protégé. His work has then exhibited in several galleries in the US, the Caribbean and Europe. Up until now, his exploration scope ranges from abstract painting techniques to the aesthetics of the industrial design. The universe of visual arts paved solid foundations for his practice in architecture —another of his early passions— and had been ever since his main vehicle of communication.

He continued his studies overseas at the Miami Dade Community College, Corps of Engineers, Rollins College, University of South Florida, Futurarium (Affiliates School of the Politecnico di Milano in 2002, the part of the Master program of the NABA, Nuova Accademia di Belle Arti Milano) under Alessandro Guirreiro and received his Master Dottorato in Design in 2002. Master and PhD courses at Institute for European Urban Studies, Bauhaus University Weimar (IfEU, Germany).

As a member of the "Studio Radiosity" (ex members of the "Menphis" design movement with Guirreiro, Mendini & Ettore Sottsass), he participated in a movement that was at the avant-garde of design in the 1990s. This was followed by work with the firm, Hellmuth, Obata & Kassabaum (HOK) in 2001, Arquitectonica in 2004 – where he specialized in large projects, from airport design to high-end luxury towers in the five continents.

In 1996, three Civilian Medals (Department of Defense, Corps of Engineers and United Nations) were presented to Richard Moreta for the responsibilities in the design and processing of high-visibility projects during the Balkans war. His service reflected these great credits placed upon him and had da direct contribution to the successful supportofo the program byproviding a  significant amount of new construction in all building types in the post-war region.

Fromthe  beginning of, 2010 Moreta is member of the faculty of Architecture and Urban Design at the Bauhaus University, Weimar, Germany as well as visiting professor at Universidad Autonoma de Santo Domingo, Universidad Central del Este, Universidad O&M, Universidad Nacional Pedro Henríquez Ureña, Pontificia Universidad Católica Madre y Maestra, Technische Universität Wien, Technische Universität Berlin, South Florida University, University of Miami, NABA – Nuova Accademia di Belle Arti Milano, Escuela Técnica Superior de Arquitectura de Barcelona and others academics institutions.

Also, since 2010 Moreta is President of Green Container International Aid, an organization whose main goal is to respond to humanitarian needs worldwide through h usage of recycled containers.

Design development, concepts, and emphasis

Richard Moreta specializes in cutting-edge, futuristic architecture. In the avant-garde of international architects, he combines the formal possibilities of structure with the available advances by using Digital Architecture, of which he is a pioneer. His buildings are dramatic and are often characterized by the combination of spaciousness and the utilization of exposed structuring – thus mixing volumes and space to create unconventional patterns intriguing and appealing to the eye. He has been both praised and criticized as a "sculptor of monuments" and for being a great artist and one of the greatest architects of his generation. His many design awards give testimony to his evaluation.

Moreta's work emphasizes as well the creative and innovative development of spatial solutions for the public sector. He has designed solutions for governments, international societies, and communities. His design regarding ecological requirements and his work includes public buildings.  

In 2004, Moreta joined the firm Arquitectonica led by Bernardo Fort-Brescia and was also the design director for various firms in South Florida. He was responsible for the design as project designer for dozens of buildings that reshaped, together with others, the landscape of the new Miami and Miami Beach during the construction boom of 2004–2006 in Florida, as well as several other high-end towers, commercial buildings, and hospitality designs in other latitudes.

In 2002, Moreta cofounded with Victor Gane, the firm GMZ-Design, in Miami, Florida. GMZ-Design achieved notoriety implementing its signature style – dramatic, Daring, and innovative, expressive in its usage of 'high tech modernism', and application of digital possibilities in the design process.  "Marquis" received international acclaim.

Moreta is the principal and founder of Richard's Architecture + Design, Inc. (RA+D), in 2006. This firm's work runs the spectrum from the m design of large-scale, high-rise condominiums to hospitality projects, as well as intimate, small-scale low-rise residential and commercial units. Moreta is the Architect Designer anTeamam Leader for projects involved in hospitality, high-end residential development, aviation, public, residential, and commercial complex facilities. RA+D has worked with international the international community from the beginning, including commissions for upscale clients in Abu Dhabi, Dubai, São Paulo, Brazil, Romania, Bosnia, Russia, Italy, Germany, Mexico, Dominican Republic, ic and Asia. Richard – give me details on where in Bosnia, Russia, Italy Germany Mexico Dominican Republic, and Asia.

Lecturer

Richard Moreta is a widely-sought lecturer on Architecture, and the future of ecologically-compatible architecture, having given conferences in the United States, Eur, ope and Latin America. He has taught in several institutions in the United States, Europe, and Latin America as at Universidad Autonoma de Santo Domingo, Universidad Central del Este, Universidad O&M, Universidad Pedro Henriquez Urena, UniversidPontificiacia Madre y Maestra, Technische Universität Wien, Technische Universität Berlin, South Florida University, University of Miami, Nuova Accademia di Belle Arti a Milano, Escuela Técnica Superior de Arquitectura de Barcelona and others academics institutions. His participation in the n Internal Congress of Architecture aa s speaker or panelist is well remarkable and he had been sharing a podium with the masters of international architecture as Frank Gehry, Zaha Hadid, Peter Eisenman, Renzo Pia, no and others from the podium of "Las Vegas" to the International Congress of Architecture.

Author

Moreta has published articles in various publications including DDN Design Diffusion News, Italy; Hospitality Design, USA; Aeroflot's magazine, Russia; PPerspectiveiv, Germany; Abitare, Italy; Kenchi Bunka, Japan; HOME, Miami, Florida.

Awards and achievements

Achievement Medal for Civilian, Archite,ct and Project Manager for the Reconstruction of Bosnia, Department of Defense, United States of America, 1996

NATO (North Atlantic Treaty Organization) Civilian Medal for the Reconstruction of Bosnia, Architect and Project Manager, 1996

Operation Joint Endeavor Civilian Award, Architect and Project Manager for the Reconstruction of Bosnia, by the United Nations, 1996

Most Distinguished International Architect from the Dominican Republic, CODIA (Dominican College of Engineers), 2011

Overseas Director of Liaisons of Encounter of Faculties of Architecture, Encuentro Nacional de Escuelasy Facultades de Arquitectura, DR, 2011

Design Award from the Friedberg Fire Department, Friedberg, Germany

Professor Emeritus Diploma from the Universidad Central de Este, 2012

Minister Adviser from the Dominican Embassy in Berlin, 2011

Project Awards by Richard's Architecture+Design and as Design Director in ARQUITECTONICA, HO,+K, and GMZ-Design (Gane-Moreta) portfolio with the project awards:

Finalist Award for the “Radical Innovation”, Hospitality Design Magazine, Green Global Competition. (2009)

“Most Distinguished International Architect International from the Dominican Republic” was awarded by the Dominican College of Architects and Engineers on November 3, 2011.

International Architects Award from the Architecture Schools and Faculties of the Dominican Republic, 2011.

Finalist Award for the “Radical Innovation”, for the Wind Tower, Hospitality Design Magazine, Green Global Competition, 2009.

Finalist Award for “Radical Innovation,” by Hospitality Design Magazine in the Green Global Competition, 2009.

American Institute of Architects, AIA, Design Excellence Award, “Sarasota Herald Tribune Headquarters”, Sarasota, Florida, U.S.A., Design Team Arquitectonica 2006

Marquis Tower, Miami, Florida (Portfolio ARQUITECTIONICA)
2011 Americas Property Award
2010 International Property Awards
2010 Residential High-Rise Development Award
2008 Miami Property Award

Infinity Tower, Dubai (Portfolio GMZ_Design)
2011 Architect Magazine, R + D Award
2008 Chicago Athenaeum, American Architecture Award
2008 Chicago Athenaeum, International Architecture Award.
2007 Arabian Property Awards, BesHigh-Risese Architecture
2007 International Property Awards, Best InternationaHigh-Risese Architecture
2006 Arabian Property Awards, Architecture, Multiple Units

Rolex Tower, Dubai, UEA (Portfolio GMZ_Design)
2011 Architect Magazine, R + D Award
2011 CTBUH, Best Tall Building Middle East & Africa: Finalist
2011 International Property Awards, Arabian Property Award for Best Mixed-use Architecture
2011 Middle East Architect Magazine, Project of the Year

References

External links
Official site

1965 births
Living people
Architects from New York City
Universidad Nacional Pedro Henríquez Ureña alumni
Arquitectonica people